Udara aristinus is a butterfly in the family Lycaenidae. It was described by Hans Fruhstorfer in 1917. It is found in the Indomalayan realm, where it has been recorded from Malaysia and Java.

References

External links
Udara at Markku Savela's Lepidoptera and Some Other Life Forms

Udara
Butterflies described in 1917
Butterflies of Java
Butterflies of Malaysia
Taxa named by Hans Fruhstorfer